Dynamic priority scheduling is a type of scheduling algorithm in which the priorities are calculated during the execution of the system. The goal of dynamic priority scheduling is to adapt to dynamically changing progress and to form an optimal configuration in a self-sustained manner. It can be very hard to produce well-defined policies to achieve the goal depending on the difficulty of a given problem.

Earliest deadline first scheduling and Least slack time scheduling are examples of Dynamic priority scheduling algorithms.

Optimal Schedulable Utilization
The idea of real-time scheduling is to confine processor utilization under schedulable utilization of a certain scheduling algorithm, which is scaled from 0 to 1. Higher schedulable utilization means higher utilization of resource and the better the algorithm. In preemptible scheduling, dynamic priority scheduling such as earliest deadline first (EDF) provides the optimal schedulable utilization of 1 in contrast to less than 0.69 with fixed priority scheduling such as rate-monotonic (RM).

In periodic real-time task model, a task's processor utilization is defined as execution time over period. Every set of periodic tasks with total processor utilization less or equal to the schedulable utilization of an algorithm can be feasibly scheduled by that algorithm. Unlike fixed priority, dynamic priority scheduling could dynamically prioritize task deadlines achieving optimal schedulable utilization in the preemptible case.

See also 
 Earliest deadline first scheduling
 Least slack time scheduling

References

Scheduling algorithms